Dale John Crafts (born December 14, 1958) is an American politician and businessman. He has started a number of businesses, including Mobility Plus, which helps people with disabilities drive more easily. Crafts was on the Lisbon, Maine Town Council before winning election to the Maine House of Representatives, where he served from 2008 to 2016.

Crafts was the Republican nominee in the 2020 election for the United States House of Representatives in Maine's 2nd congressional district. He has been paralyzed from the waist down since the age of 25, when he was hit by a car while riding his motorcycle.

Early life and family
Crafts was born in Fort Lauderdale, Florida, and raised in Lisbon Falls, Maine.

Crafts' cousins: Garrett Mason, Gina Mason, and Rick Mason also served in the Maine Legislature.

Business career
After he was paralyzed in a motorcycle accident at age 25, Crafts started a company called Mobility Plus, which helps people with disabilities drive more easily. Crafts has started a number of other businesses, including a self-storage business.

2020 U.S. House election

Crafts became the Republican nominee for Maine's 2nd congressional district in 2020 after defeating realtor Adrienne Bennett and former state Senator Eric Brakey in a three-way primary election. President Donald Trump endorsed Crafts on August 1, 2020. As Maine uses ranked-choice voting, he was in first place with just under 46% of the vote in the first round. In the second round, he won with 58.5% of the vote. He faced Democratic incumbent Jared Golden in the general election. On November 3, 2020, Golden won reelection with 53% of the vote to Crafts' 47%.

References

External links
 
 Profile at Ballotpedia

|-

1958 births
21st-century American businesspeople
21st-century American politicians
Businesspeople from Maine
Living people
Maine city council members
Republican Party members of the Maine House of Representatives
People from Lisbon, Maine
Politicians from Fort Lauderdale, Florida
Politicians with paraplegia